John Desmond Murray (1916–2005) was an Irish Anglican priest: he was Archbishop's Archdeacon in the Province of Dublin from 1973 to 1982.

Murray was educated at Trinity College, Dublin and ordained in 1939.  After three curacies in Dublin he was a Minor Canon at St Patrick's Cathedral in the same city. He was the Incumbent at Powerscourt from 1949 to 1953; a Naval Chaplain from 1953 to 1955; at Dalkey from 1955 to 1970; and at Milltown from 1970 to 1982.

References

1916 births
2005 deaths
Alumni of Trinity College Dublin
Archdeacons of Dublin